Marion Davis may refer to:

Marion Keene, known as Marion Davis, British big band singer
Marion Davis Berdecio, born Marion Davis, spy

See also
Marion Davies, American film actress
Marion Davies (figure skater), British figure skater